Al-Ab Anastas Mari Al-Karmali, Anastas the Carmelite, or Père Anastase-Marie de Saint-Élie (5 August 1866 – January 7, 1947), a Lebanese Christian priest and linguist who made important contributions in Arabic linguistics and philology. His philology periodical, Lughat Al Arab , announced the discovery In 1914 of the lost text of the first Arabic dictionary, "Kitab al-'Ayn",.

Life
Butrus ibn Jibrayl Yusuf 'Awwad's father came from Bharsaf, close to the town of Bikfaya in Lebanon, and moved to Baghdad where he married Butrus's mother, Mariam Maragharitta. Butrus was one of five sons and four daughters and he would go on to become a priest taking the name Father Anastas. He studied in Madrasat Al-Aaba' Al-Karmaliyin (The School of the Carmelite Fathers) and graduated from the Madrasat Al-Ittifaq Al-Kathuliki in 1882. He returned to the Madrasat Al-Aba' Al-Karmaliyin, to teach Arabic, and by the age of 16 was publishing articles.

In 1886, aged 20, he moved to Beirut to teach at the Kulliat Al-Aba' Alyasu'iyun (The college of Jesuit Fathers) and to continue his Arabic studies. There he studied Latin, Greek, French and French literature. In 1887 he continued his studies at a monastery in Chèvremont, near Liège, Belgium, adopting celibacy and the name Anastas Mari Al-Karmali. In 1889 he went to Montpellier, France, to study philosophy, theology, Biblical exegesis and the history of Christianity and was ordained a priest in 1894, taking the name Père Anastase-Marie de Saint-Elie.  In the following period he toured Spain, visiting the Islamic monuments before returning to Iraq.   As principal of the Carmelite school, the Madrasat Al-Aaba' Al-Karmaliyin, he taught Arabic and French, preached and counselled.

His published articles in the magazines of Egypt, Syria and Iraq, appeared under many pseudonyms:
Satisna, 'Amkah, Kalda, Fahar al-Jabiri, al-Shaykh Buayth al-Khudry, Mustahilun ('Beginner'), Mutatafilin ('Intruder'), Muntahilun ('Start'), Mubtadi ('Novice'), Ibn al-Khadra', etc.

In addition to comparative studies of Latin and Greek in relationship to Arabic, he studied Aramaic (Syriac), Hebrew, Abyssinian (Habesha), Persian, Turkish, Sabthi (Sabian), English, Italian and Spanish. His Arabic language magazine was published three years before and six years after WWI.  During the war the Ottomans refused him leave and he remain in Kayseri in Central Anatoli for a year and ten months between 1914 and 1916, when he was returned to Baghdad. He traveled to Europe many times and in the period of the British occupation of Iraq was a member on the Government Board of Education. He edited the "Dar es-Salaam" magazine for three years. 
He remained a conservative and wore monastic dress until his death in Baghdad on 7 January 1947.

Membership of Academic Societies
The Language Academy of Egypt (Cairo) 
Arab Scientific Academy of Damascus 
German Orientalist Group()

Contributions to Arabic Language Studies
His observance of the omission of some Arabic terms used by poets and authors of antiquity in the traditional Arabic language dictionaries, led him to embark on authoring his own dictionary in 1883. He changed its title from "The Tail to Lisan Al-Arab" to "Al-Musa'id" ("The Helper"). In 1911 he founded Lughat Al Arab (Arabic: Arab Language) a philology journal.

Works of Classification
Dictionary Assistant - 
On Language, Poets & Writers of Baghdad (Five vols.) - 
Emergence of The Arabic language, Its Growth and Complexity - 
Mistakes of Ancient Linguists - 
Arab Money and the Science of Growth - 
Winning the Wanted on the History of Baghdad - 
Concise History of Iraq - 
Arab Religions - 
History of the Kurds - 
Population of Languages - 
Historical and Scientific Illumination 
Two Large Forms - 
Attractions of Baghdad and Translations of Some Scholars - 
Sumer Magazine Report - 
The Arabs Before Islam - 
Proverbs of Baghdad, Mosul and Basra - 

Library Contributions
About 1920 he became the first librarian of the ‘Maktabat as-Salam’ the Baghdad Peace Library, and introduced a system of modern management. He helped develop the Library's collection, donating printed materials from his private collection, when other collections in foreign languages remained in the monastery library.  The Peace Library was later renamed the Baghdad Public Library, and in 1961 became the basis for the establishment of the Iraq National Library.
Shortly before his death, the Iraq Museum Library received a generous donation of 2,500 books and 1,500 manuscripts from the Carmelite's, or Al-Karmali's personal library.

References

Lebanese Roman Catholic priests
Carmelites
Iraqi Christians
Linguists from Iraq
1866 births
1947 deaths
Lebanese people of Iraqi descent